The 1995 Arab Club Champions Cup was played in Saudi Arabia in the city of Riyadh. Al-Hilal won the championship for the second time beating in the final Espérance de Tunis.

Participants

Preliminary round

Final tournament
Final tournament held in Riyadh, Saudi Arabia in December 1995.

Group stage

Group A

Group B

Knockout stage

Semi-finals

Final

Winners

References

External links
8th Arab Club Champions Cup 1995 - rsssf.com

UAFA Club Cup, 1995
UAFA Club Cup, 1995
1995